Geovanny Mera (born 16 August 1962) is an Ecuadorian footballer. He played in five matches for the Ecuador national football team in 1987. He was also part of Ecuador's squad for the 1987 Copa América tournament.

References

1962 births
Living people
Ecuadorian footballers
Ecuador international footballers
Association football forwards
People from Ambato, Ecuador
Delfín S.C. managers
S.D. Quito managers